Beam tilt is used in radio to aim the main lobe of the  vertical plane radiation pattern of an antenna below (or above) the horizontal plane.

The simplest way is mechanical beam tilt, where the antenna is physically mounted in such a manner as to lower the angle of the signal on one side.  However, this also raises it on the other side, making it useful in only very limited situations.

More common is electrical beam tilt, where the phasing between antenna elements is tweaked to make the signal go down (usually) in all directions.  This is extremely useful when the antenna is at a very high point, and the edge of the signal is likely to miss the target (broadcast audience, cellphone users, etc.) entirely.

With electrical tilting, front and back lobes tilt in the same direction. For example, an electrical downtilt will make both the front lobe and the back lobe tilt down. This is the property used in the above example where the signal is pointed down in all directions. On the contrary, mechanical downtilting will make the front lobe tilt down and the back lobe tilt up. In almost all practical cases, antennas are only tilted down – though tilting up is technically possible.

The use of purely electrical tilt with no mechanical tilt is an attractive choice for aesthetic reasons which are very important for operators seeking acceptance of integrated antennas in visible locations.

In GSM and UMTS cellular networks, mechanical tilt is almost always fixed whereas electrical tilt can be controlled using remote actuators and position sensors, thus reducing operating expenses. Remote electrical tilt is abbreviated as RET and it is part of the Antenna Interface Standards Group's  open specification for the control interface of antenna devices.

Occasionally, mechanical and electrical tilt will be used together in order to create greater beam tilt in one direction than the other, mainly to accommodate unusual terrain.  Along with null fill, beam tilt is the essential parameter controlling the focus of radio communications, and together they can create almost infinite combinations of 3-D radiation patterns for any situation.

Beam tilt optimization 
Beam tilt optimization is a network optimization technique used in mobile networks aiming at controlling the inclination of the vertical tilt angle of the antenna in order to optimize a set of network performance indicators.

Different studies in beam tilt optimization focus on Coverage-Capacity Optimization (CCO), for which the goal is to control the beam tilt in order to jointly optimize the radio coverage and capacity in the network cells and reduce interference from neighbouring cells.

There exists mainly two types of approaches to beam tilt optimization:

 Rule-based algorithms: consist of optimization strategies based on domain knowledge and control theory, and mainly based on the optimization of utility metrics, or threshold-based policies employing Fuzzy Logic (FL) to model representative network performance indicators.
 Data-driven algorithms : consist of optimization strategies based on the use learning techniques based on the availability of network data (e.g. Contextual Bandit (CB) techniques), or by directly interacting with the environment (e.g. Reinforcement Learning (RL) techniques )

References 

Antennas
Broadcast engineering